This is a list of the National Register of Historic Places listings in Mills County, Texas.

This is intended to be a complete list of properties listed on the National Register of Historic Places in Mills County, Texas. There are three properties listed on the National Register in the county. Two properties together are part of a State Antiquities Landmark and are each Recorded Texas Historic Landmarks. The remaining property is also a State Antiquities Landmark.

Current listings

The locations of National Register properties may be seen in a mapping service provided.

|}

See also

National Register of Historic Places listings in Texas
Recorded Texas Historic Landmarks in Mills County

References

External links

Mills County, Texas
Mills County
Buildings and structures in Mills County, Texas